Bretten (South Franconian: Bredde) is a town in the state of Baden-Württemberg, Germany. It is located on Bertha Benz Memorial Route.

Geography
Bretten lies in the centre of a rectangle that is formed by Heidelberg, Karlsruhe, Heilbronn and Stuttgart as corners. It has a population of approximately 28,000. The centre of Bretten consists of many old half-timbered houses around a lively marketplace. Towns and villages under the administration of Bretten include Bauerbach, Büchig, Diedelsheim, Dürrenbüchig, Gölshausen, Neibsheim, Rinklingen, Ruit and Sprantal.

History
Bretten was first mentioned as "villa breteheim" in the "Lorsch codex" in 767. Since 1148 Bretten had the right to mint and issue coins. In 1254 Bretten received city rights. In 1492 Bretten was granted to hold four fairs by Pfalzgraf Philipp. Philipp Melanchthon was born in Bretten in 1497. The residents of Bretten successfully sallied against the Swabian besiegers around Ulrich of Württemberg in 1504. In 1803 Bretten became “Badische Amtsstadt”. After the industrial revolution, the local economy was dominated by cooker production for many years. In 1975 Bretten was given the status of a "Große Kreisstadt" (district city).

Transport

Bretten station is on the Württemberg Western Railway and the Kraichgau Railway. Every two hours there are direct train connections to Stuttgart and Heidelberg. Many commuters live in Bretten and use S4 services of the Karlsruhe Stadtbahn, which runs three times an hour to Karlsruhe and back. In Bretten there are five Stadtbahn stations and five more stations in the villages that belong to the district of Bretten. The motorways A5, A6 and A8 are reachable within approximately 30 minutes.

Peter and Paul Festival
The largest event in Bretten is the annual Peter and Paul Festival, which usually attracts up to 80,000 visitors. It is held one long weekend in summer. The main attractions are the numerous performances in countless camps and in the medieval lanes in the old town of Bretten. On Sunday, a huge procession of dressed-up citizens and guest groups takes place.

Visitors may be irritated or amused by the mixture of costumes which are related to different centuries. You can see medieval men-at-arms, shepherds, musicians and jugglers, as well as Biedermeier styled families and militias. But the festival has three different sources. The oldest is the successful sally of citizens and men-at-arms on June 28, 1504 against Swabian besiegers. Bretten was also the place for a traditional competition called the “shepherds’ jump”, that was celebrated by all local shepherds. During the 16th and the 18th century several shooting competitions took place, some of them on the Peter and Paul Day. In 1805 a citizen's militia was founded in Bretten. Since then the Peter and Paul Festival has been celebrated regularly. After the Revolution in Baden the militias were not allowed to wear weapons anymore and the festival became a children’s festival. In 1923 the militia was refounded and the festival became bigger, with many guests and militias from other towns. After World War II the American administration allowed the festival to happen again in 1950, with a new militia and several societies that promoted the medieval aspects of the sally in 1504. Nowadays the organising society tends to advance the medieval aspects of the festival. Many citizens of Bretten are busy all the year round organising the Festival, preparing their costumes, studying old books, practising music (especially drumming), fighting, dancing, juggling or practising other performances. Since the 1980s, the organising society has also engaged professional artists.

The festival also provides a fairground that attracts mainly kids and teenagers. For most citizens and guests the festival is the most important meeting point for former, existing or new friendships, or – as a pupil told the Bretten newspapers: “For me the Peter-and-Paul-Festival is a festival of love”.

Media
Newspaper: Brettener Woche/Kraichgauer Bote

Twin towns – sister cities

Bretten is twinned with:

 Condeixa-a-Nova, Portugal
 Hemer, Germany
 Hidas, Hungary
 Longjumeau, France
 Nemesnádudvar, Hungary
 Neuflize, France
 Pontypool, Wales, United Kingdom
 Valserhône, France
 Wittenberg, Germany

Notable people

Schwickart the Younger of Sickingen (died 1478), Amtmann of Bretten
Philipp Melanchthon (1497–1560), companion of the Protestant reformer Martin Luther
Samuel Eisenmenger (1534–1585), physician and astronomer
Christian Mayer (1827–1910), Wisconsin businessman, mayor and legislator
Hermann Weber (1899–1956), zoologist
Peter Reichert (born 1961), footballer
Mile Kekin (born 1971), frontman of the Croatian band Hladno pivo
Serhat Akın (born 1981), footballer
Selçuk Alibaz (born 1989), footballer

References

External links

Official Web Site of Bretten
Official Web Site of the organising society of the Peter-and-Paul-Festival (German)
Official Peter-and-Paul-Festival Web Site (German)
History of the city arms 
Bertha Benz Memorial Route

Historic Jewish communities
Karlsruhe (district)
Baden